Fiambre is a traditional Guatemalan salad that is prepared and eaten yearly to celebrate the Day of the Dead and the All Saints Day. It is served chilled and may be made with dozens of ingredients.

History
Fiambre started out from the tradition in Guatemala of taking dead family members their favorite dishes to the cemeteries for the Day of the Dead. As all different families brought food to the celebrations, they became mixed, eventually mixing them together to this all-encompassing salad. Ingredients usually include numerous sausages and cold cuts, pickled baby corn and onion, beets, pacaya flower, different cheeses, olives, chicken, and sometimes even brussels sprouts.

This dish varies from family to family, recipes traditionally passed on to younger generations. Because of this, on the Day of The Dead, it is customary to share your fiambre with other families and relatives.

Variants

Some variants are:
Fiambre from Antigua
Fiambre rojo (with beets)
Fiambre blanco (no beets)
Fiambre desarmado (traditional of the department of Jalapa)
Fiambre verde (no cold cuts, vegetarian)

References

Day of the Dead food
Guatemalan cuisine
National dishes
Salads
Catholic cuisine